The 2011–12 Northern Iowa Panthers men's basketball team represented the University of Northern Iowa during the 2011–12 NCAA Division I men's basketball season. The Panthers, led by sixth year head coach Ben Jacobson, played their home games at McLeod Center and are members of the Missouri Valley Conference. They finished the season 20–14, 9–9 in MVC play to finish in a five-way tie for third place. As the 5 seed, they lost in the quarterfinals of the Missouri Valley Basketball tournament to Illinois State. They were invited to the 2012 National Invitation Tournament where they defeated Saint Joseph's in the first round before falling in the second round to Drexel.

Roster

Schedule

|-
!colspan=9| Exhibition

|-
!colspan=9| Regular season

|-
!colspan=9| Missouri Valley Conference tournament

|-
!colspan=9| 2012 NIT

References

Northern Iowa Panthers men's basketball seasons
Northern Iowa
Northern Iowa
Northern Iowa Panthers basketball
Northern Iowa Panthers basketball